Several historical evidences shed light on a significant Malankara–Persian ecclesiastical relationship that spanned centuries. While an ecclesiastical relationship existed between the Saint Thomas Christians of India and the Church in Sassanid Empire (Church of the East) in the earlier centuries, closer ecclesiastical ties developed as early as seventh century, when India became an ecclesiastical province of the Church of the East, albeit restricted to matters of purely ecclesiastical nature such as ordination of priests, and not involved in matters of temporal administration. This relationship endured until the Portuguese protectorate of Cochin of Malabar came to be in 16th century, and the Portuguese discovery of a sea route to India. The Christians who came under the two ancient yet distinct lineages of Malankara and Persia had one factor in common: their Saint Thomas heritage. The Church of the East shared communion with the Great Church (Catholicism, Eastern Orthodoxy and Oriental Orthodoxy) until the Council of Ephesus in the 5th century, separating primarily over differences in Christology.

The Saint Thomas Christians of India came in contact with Portuguese Latin Catholic missionaries only in the 16th century. Later, after the Oath of Koonan Cross (meaning "leaning cross") in 1653, the Saint Thomas Christians came in touch with the Syriac Orthodox Church.

Though claims have been made that the Saint Thomas Christians of Malankara had close interactions with the Roman Catholic Church and Syriac Orthodox Church before the 16th century, these assertions lack proof.

Early references

The celebrated Church historian Eusebius has mentioned in his work that the Alexandrian scholar Pantenus had seen Christians during his visit to India between 180 A. D. and 190 A. D. This account of Eusebius has later been quoted by several historians. According to Eusebius, Pantenus saw people reading the Gospel according to Mathew in Hebrew. Based on this reference by Eusebius, Jerome has recorded the existence of Christians in India during the early centuries of Christian Era. In addition to this, Jerome mentions that Pantenus held debates with Brahmins and philosophers in India.

The evangelization of India is mentioned in a number of ancient works, including the book Acts of Judas Thomas written in Edessa around 180 A. D. in Syriac language, and Didascalia (meaning teachings of the Apostles) written around 250 A. D. Historians have often remarked that the Persians might have received this tradition about the Church in India from India itself.

The Chronicle of Seert is a historical document compiled in the Middle Ages. In this Chronicle, the Church in India is mentioned along with the history of Persian Church and the Patriarchs (Catholicoi) of Babylon. It also states that during the reigns of Shahlufa and Papa bar Aggai as the heads of Persian Church, the Persian bishop David of Basra preached the Gospel in India. Some historians' records regarding the participation of Bishop John representing Persia and India as the Bishop of the all of Persia and Greater India in the first Ecumenical Council of Nicaea in 325 A. D. remains a matter of contention among historians.

Ishodad was a famous Bible scholar who lived in Persia in the 5th century. In his commentary on the Epistle to Romans, a note is scribbled in the margin that may be translated as: This article is translated by Mar Komai with the help of Daniel, an Indian priest, from Greek to Syriac. This statement reveals the connection between the Indian priest Daniel and the Persian bishop Mar Komai.

Persian Immigration
The two instances of immigration from Persia to Malankara (India) substantiate the Malankara-Persia connection. The first of these, which occurred in the 4th century, was led by a merchant named Thoma (fondly referred to as Knai Thoma or Knai Thomman by the Christians of Malankara, meaning Thomas of Cana), while the second immigration was led by two Persian bishops, Prod and Sappor in the 9th century.

There exists the strong traditional belief that Thomas of Cana, accompanied by a Persian bishop and seventy two families, reached the ancient port of Kodungallur in India. The history of Knanaya in Malankara is inseparably related to this immigration.

In 825 A. D., a group of Persians under the leadership of two Persian bishops Prod (or Proth, also known as Aphroth) and Sappor (also known as Sabrisho)reached Kerala and resided in Quilon. They received great honors from the native ruler known as Sthanu Ravi Varma who bestowed 72 titles and special rights and concessions on them. The king believed that the immigrants who were merchants by profession would boost the economy. Their Church in Quilon was known as Thareesa Pally and the titles were engraved on metal plates known as Thareesa Pally Chepped.

Indian Church records
The oldest known Syriac manuscript copied in India in 1301 AD at Cranganore (1612 AG) at the Church dedicated to Mar Quriaqos and currently kept at the Vatican Library (MS Vatican Syriac 22) was written in Estrangela script by a very young deacon named Zakharya bar Joseph bar Zakharya, who was just 14 at the time of writing. In that lectionary, it is stated that it was compiled during the time of Church of the East Patriarch Yahballaha III and Mar Yakob, the Metropolitan on the throne of St. Thomas in India at Kodungallur. The Church fathers Nestorius, Theodore and Deodore, who are venerated in the Church of the East, are also mentioned in this lectionary. Johannes P. M. van der Ploeg comments that the author refers to Yahballaha III as 'the fifth'.

Persian Bishops in Malankara 
While some Persian Bishops who traveled to Malankara belonged to different groups of immigrants fleeing persecution, others visited Malankara to provide spiritual administration to the Malankara Nasranis. Niranam Grandhavari gives a list (incomplete) of Persian bishops and the year of their visits to Malankara.
 Mar Joseph of Uraha (Edessa) (345 A. D.)
 Mar Sabor and Mar Proth (825 A. D.) 
 Mar Yohannan (988 A.D.)
 Mar Joseph (1056 A.D.)
 Mar Yacob (1122 A. D.)
 Mar Joseph (1221 A.D.)
 Mar David (1285 A.D.)
 Mar Yabaloha (1407 A.D.)
 Mar Thoma and Mar Yohannan (1490 A.D.)
 Mar Yahballaha, Mar Dinkha and Mar Yacob (1504 A.D.)
 Mar Abraham (1565 A. D.) 
It is worth noting that the Chaldean Catholic Church was originated only in 1552 AD following a schism in the Church of the East. This invalidates recent claims that the Persian Bishops were sent by the Chaldean Catholic Patriarch, which is impossible considering that almost all of them visited Malankara before the origin of Chaldean Catholic Church.

Persian Church Records 
Several evidences are available from the historical records of Persian Church and letters of Persian bishops which corroborate the Malankara-Persian relation.

In the 5th century, Mar Mana, the Persian bishop of Rev Ardashir recorded that while sending his theological works and the works and translations of other Persian bishops to various places, they were sent to India as well.

In the 6th century during the reign of Persian emperor Khosrau II, bishop Marutha reached Persia as the delegate of the Roman Emperor and visited the Persian Patriarch Sabrisho I (594–604). It is recorded that during this visit, the Patriarch presented bishop Marutho with fragrant spices and other special gifts which he had received from India.

Two letters from Persian Patriarch Ishoyahb III to the Metropolitan bishop of Fars between 650 and 660 A. D. show that the Indian Christians were under the jurisdiction of the Persian Patriarchate. In the 7th century, Fars was an eparchy (ecclesiastical province) in the Persian Church with Rev Ardashir as its capital. At that time, Metropolitan bishop Simon of Rev Ardashir was in charge of the affairs of the Church of India. However, a situation arose in which the bishop became hostile to the Patriarch, resulting in excommunication. In his letter, the Patriarch reprimands the bishop and complains that because of the opposition of the bishop, it was impossible to tend to the spiritual needs of the faithful in India. The Patriarch adds that the Indians were cut off from the Patriarchate and the annual offertory given to the Patriarch by the Indians was no longer given. Following this, Patriarch Ishoyahb III issued an encyclical releasing the Church of India from the jurisdiction of Fars eparchy and appointed a Metropolitan Bishop for India. According to the canons of Persian Church in the medieval centuries, the bishop of India came tenth in the ecclesiastical hierarchy, followed by the bishop of China. The title of the Metropolitan bishop of India was the Metropolitan and Gate of all India.

During the reign of Patriarch Timothy the Great (780–823) also, the Patriarch released the Church of India from the authority of the bishop of Fars, placing it under his direct jurisdiction. Historians refer to two letters written by Patriarch Timothy with regard to the Church of India. The first letter contains guidelines for the election of Metropolitans. The letter demands that the acknowledgement of the Patriarch must be obtained after the people selected bishops based on the guidelines set by the Patriarch, before requesting the acknowledgement of the Emperor. In the second letter addressed to the Archdeacon of Malankara, the Patriarch mentions some violations of canon in the Church of India. The Patriarch also demands that bishops should abstain from entering wedlock and consuming meat.

While writing about the journeys of Nestorian missionaries during his reign, Timothy I himself says (in Letter 13) that a number of monks go across the sea to India with nothing but a staff and a beggar's bag.

In the Persian Church, the bishops were supposed to report to the Patriarch every year. However, Patriarch Theodosius (853–858) suggested that the bishops of distant places like India and China need to report only once every six years, owing to the great distance.

In 1129, in response to the request of the Church of India, the Persian Patriarch Eliya II sent bishop Mar Yohannan to Malabar (Kerala, India). Mar Yohannan reached Kodungallur and gave the Church spiritual leadership from there. In 1490, a three-member delegation of the Christians of Malankara left for Baghdad with a petition to the Patriarch requesting him to appoint a Metropolitan Bishop for them. One of them perished on the way. The remaining two, named George and Joseph, were ordained to priesthood by Patriarch Shemʿon IV Basidi. The Patriarch selected two monks from the monastery of Mar Augen and consecrated them as bishops Mar Thoma and Mar John. These bishops accompanied the two priests on their return to India. Bishop Mar John died shortly after. Later, Mar Thoma and the priest Joseph returned to Baghdad.

Patriarch Eliya V, who ascended the throne in 1502, sent three bishops, namely Mar Yabalaha, Mar Yakob and Mar Denaha to Malankara. By the time they reached Malankara, the Portuguese explorer Vasco da Gama had already set foot in Kerala. The three bishops were detained by the Portuguese. Few years later, Patriarch Abdisho IV Maron sent bishop Abraham to Malankara. Mar Abraham was also imprisoned by the Portuguese. As a result of the injuries suffered at the hands of the Portuguese, Mar Abraham died in 1597. Thus, the authority of Persian bishops in Malankara reached its termination.

Testimonials of Travelers
The 6th century Gallo-Roman historian Gregory of Tours has recorded the trips of Theodore, a Persian monk, to India on several occasions where the latter visited the tomb of Apostle St. Thomas and an adjoining monastery.

Near the end of the 6th century, the Persian scholar Bodha has recorded his visit to India where he held discussions with Indian religious scholars in Sanskrit language.

Cosmas Indicopleustes, the Alexandrian traveler visited India during 520–525. Later, he wrote a book titled Christian Topography in which he mentions the Churches of Persia, India, Ceylon etc. Cosmas states the existence of Christians in Malabar, where pepper grows. Cosmas also records that there were Christians at Kalyana (Kalyan in Mumbai, India) with a bishop appointed from Persia. The traveler tries to emphasize the spread of Christianity in all these places.

Marco Polo, who visited Kerala in 1295 has recorded that he saw Nestorian Christians there.

A lectionary compiled in 1301 in Syriac language at Kodungallur in Kerala is kept in the collection of Syriac manuscripts in the Vatican Library. In that lectionary, it is stated that it was compiled during the time of Church of the East Patriarch Yahballaha III and Mar Yakob, the Metropolitan on the throne of St. Thomas in India at Kodungallur. The Church fathers Nestorius, Theodore and Deodore, who are venerated in the Church of the East, are also mentioned in this lectionary.

In an Arabic document written near the end of 14th century titled Churches and Monasteries in Egypt and its surroundings, it is mentioned that pilgrims visit the tomb of Apostle St. Thomas in Mylapore, India. In the same document, it is stated that a Church in the name of the Mother of God exists in Kullam (modern day Kollam in Kerala) and that the Christians there are pro-Nestorians.

Persian Stone Crosses in Malankara
The Persian stone crosses in Malankara are eternal witnesses to Malankara-Persia connection. At present, five such Persian crosses exist, two at Kottayam (Knanite) Knanaya Jacobite Valiya pally (meaning greater church), one each at Mylapore St. Thomas Mount, Kadamattom St. George Orthodox Church and Muttuchira Catholic Church. These crosses are chiseled on stone and embedded in the walls of these churches. Some writings in ancient Persian language are also engraved near these crosses. The central panel, which contains the figure of the cross with its symbolic ornaments, is enclosed by an arch that has an inscription in the Pahlavi script of Sassanian Persia.

Decisions of the Synod of Diamper
The infamous Synod of Diamper was a calculated move towards separating the Malankara Church from Persian connection and bringing it under the Pope of Rome. This was the aim of Portuguese missionaries since the beginning of their missionary works in India. Their efforts culminated in the Synod of Diamper in 1599. Aleixo de Menezes, the Roman Catholic Archbishop of Goa, who visited the churches of Malankara prior to convening the synod, had expressed his indignation over the prayer for the Patriarch of Persia amid the Divine Liturgy in those churches. He strictly admonished that the pope was the general primate (Catholicos) of the Church and in his stead, no one else should be prayed for. Several canons of the synod, including canons 12, 17, 19 etc. were solely aimed at obstructing and obliterating Malankara-Persian relation and establishing a relationship with Rome instead.

In spite of almost sixteen centuries of Persian connection, a majority of the Christians of Malankara became associated with the Roman Catholic Church and Western Syriac Church of Antioch (Syriac Orthodox). At present, only a very small minority of Christians in Malankara (numbering around 50,000) are in direct connection with the Assyrian Church of the East.

Liturgical Language
During the early centuries of Christian Era, the population to the east of Tigris–Euphrates river system was under Persian rule, while the population to its west was under Roman rule. The Syrian people spread over the two empires used the Syriac language independently by developing distinct transformations from basic Esṭrangēlā. The form of Syriac which was developed in Persia resembled Esṭrangēlā more closely, and is referred to as Eastern Syriac, Chaldean Syriac or Nestorian Syriac. Until the 17th century, the Church of India used this dialect. Following the Synod of Diamper in 1599 and the Oath of Coonan Cross in 1653, they came in direct contact with the West Syriac tradition and hence with the West Syriac dialect of the language. Until then, the Liturgy of Nestorius, who is considered a saint by the Chaldean Church and anathematized by the Western Syriac tradition, was popular in Malankara. Gregorios Abdal Jaleel, who was the first West Syrian bishop to visit Malankara, faced severe opposition from the people of Malankara for following West Syrian liturgy, and was asked to follow the East Syrian liturgy, which the people referred to as old liturgy.

Since the 17th century, efforts were made by the visiting bishops of West Syriac tradition to establish the use of western dialect in liturgy in Malankara. Written in a more roundly form, this dialect is known as Western Syriac, Maronite Syriac or Jacobite Syriac. As both these forms are indistinguishable in terms of grammar and meaning, they differ only in the shape of letters and pronunciation. Even though the Western Syriac was introduced in the Malankara Church in the 17th century, its use was still greatly eclipsed by the use of Eastern Syriac until the 19th century, as shown by the pronunciations in the Eastern Syriac way which have transcended into the daily usage and liturgical translations of the Christians of Malankara. This is exemplified by the pronunciation of words like Sleeba, Kablana, Qurbana, Kasa, Thablaitha etc. (instead of Sleebo, Kablono, Qurbono, Kaso, Thablaitho as in the Western dialect) which has remained unchanged through the centuries. Even the letters written by the primate of Malankara Church, Malankara Metropolitan Mar Dionysius, the Great (+1808) were in Eastern Syriac. It was only in 1789 that Mar Dionysius, the Great agreed to replace East Syrian Liturgy with West Syrian Liturgy, a decision that was approved by the Malankara Palliyogam (assembly of parish representatives) through the historical document Puthiyacavu Padiyola. The move to West Syrian Liturgy was fully implemented by the Malankara Palliyogam of 1809 through the declaration Kandanad Padiyola.

See also 
India (East Syriac ecclesiastical province)
Church of the East in India
Assyrian Church of the East in India

References

Bibliography

 
 

 
 
 
 
 

Saint Thomas Christians
Christianity in Kerala
History of Oriental Orthodoxy
Church of the East
Assyrian Church of the East